Plum Tree is an unincorporated community in Rock Creek Township, Huntington County, Indiana.

History
Never officially platted, Plum Tree took its name from a large, wild plum tree. A post office was established at Plum Tree in 1876, and remained in operation until it was discontinued in 1893.

Geography

References

Unincorporated communities in Huntington County, Indiana
Unincorporated communities in Indiana